The statue of the 1st Marquess of Westminster is an outdoor sculpture depicting the owner and developer of the surrounding Grosvenor estate, Robert Grosvenor, 1st Marquess of Westminster. The statue by Jonathan Wylder is located at the corner of Wilton and Grosvenor Crescents, Belgravia, London, England, and was commissioned by Gerald Grosvenor, 6th Duke of Westminster in 1998.

The design includes two Talbot dogs which are also featured on the Grosvenor family coat of arms. Below the family motto Virtus non stemma ('Valour not Garland') is a quote by John Ruskin:

See also
 Statue of Richard Grosvenor, Second Marquess of Westminster

References

External links
 

1998 establishments in the United Kingdom
1998 sculptures
Belgravia
Bronze sculptures in the United Kingdom
Monuments and memorials in London
Outdoor sculptures in London
Westminster
Westminster